Josephine Caddy (c. 1916 – 2006) was an American-Australian painter and ceramicist, who worked in the media of acrylic, oil, printmaking, drawing, and ceramics. She focused on portraiture in both her paintings and ceramics, including "people pots", vases featuring human faces.

Biography 
Caddy was born in Washington, USA and spent part of her childhood in Juneau, Alaska. She completed a degree in Fine Arts at the Vancouver School of Art. 

She arrived in Tasmania in 1951 and moved to Adelaide in 1957, where she frequently held exhibitions of her work and taught at the South Australian School of Art (now the University of South Australia), University of Adelaide and Girton Girls' School. Caddy was divorced and had three children.

Notable works 
Jo Caddy's paintings are held by the Art Gallery of South Australia and in several private collections. Seven of her portraits were finalists in the Archibald Prize and she won the Portia Geach Memorial Award in 1967.

Caddy produced portraits of several notable Australian and international figures including:

 Joy Adamson (naturalist)
 Justice John Jefferson Bray (Chief Justice of the Supreme Court of South Australia)
Christopher Coventry (artist) (Finalist 1973 Archibald Prize)
Lawrence Daws (artist) (Winner 1967 Portia Geach Memorial Award; Finalist 1967 Archibald Prize)
 John Gaden (actor) (Finalist 1968 Archibald Prize)
 Sir Robert Helpmann (ballet dancer, actor and choreographer)
 Brian Medlin (Professor of Philosophy, Flinders University)
 Milton Moon (Australian artist)
Seymour Segal (Canadian artist)
 Mervyn Smith (Australian artist)
 Hamilton D'Arcy Sutherland (heart surgeon)

References 

1910s births
2006 deaths
20th-century Australian artists
American emigrants to Australia
Place of birth missing
Date of birth unknown
Place of death missing
Date of death missing